Paul Thissen (born December 10, 1966) is an American politician, attorney, and jurist serving as an associate justice of the Minnesota Supreme Court. He previously served as the Speaker of the Minnesota House of Representatives and DFL Minority Leader. Thissen was the longest-serving leader of the Minnesota House Democrats since Martin Olav Sabo in the 1970s. A member of the Minnesota Democratic-Farmer-Labor Party (DFL), he represented District 61B in south Minneapolis. First elected in 2002, Thissen was reelected every two years through 2016. On April 17, 2018, Governor Mark Dayton appointed Thissen to the Minnesota Supreme Court. He was sworn in on May 14, 2018. He is the first person to have served both as Minnesota House Speaker and on the Minnesota Supreme Court.

Family and education
Thissen was born in Bloomington, Minnesota. His parents, Frank and Barb Thissen, were both lifelong educators. Frank grew up on a farm in Blooming Prairie, Minnesota, that the family still owns, and worked for the Saint Paul Public Schools as a teacher, counselor, and administrator. Barb worked for many years as a special education teacher for Richfield Public Schools.

After graduating from the Academy of Holy Angels in Richfield, Minnesota, Thissen attended Harvard University and graduated with high honors in 1989. He earned a J.D. degree from the University of Chicago Law School in 1992.

Thissen is married to Karen Wilson Thissen.  They have three children, Emily, Griffin and Evan, and a dog named Kodak.

Career 
Thissen clerked for James B. Loken of the U.S. Court of Appeals for the Eighth Circuit and then went to work at the Minneapolis law firm of Briggs & Morgan, where he specialized in general litigation and appellate work and served as chair of the firm's Pro Bono Committee. During Thissen's tenure, he pioneered new approaches for lawyers to serve the community, initiating partnerships with several local non-profits. The firm more than doubled the hours of free legal services it provided to low-income individuals and nonprofits. Thissen also worked for the Minnesota State Public Defender's Office and founded "Access for Persons with Disabilities," a group of lawyers dedicated to providing legal services to persons with disabilities.

Thissen later worked as an attorney specializing in health care law at the Minneapolis office of the law firm of Ballard Spahr. In 2006, he was named one of "Forty Under 40" top business professionals in the Twin Cities by the Minneapolis / St. Paul Business Journal. In 2008, he was named one of the "Best Brains" in the Twin Cities by Mpls.St.Paul Magazine. In 2008 and 2012, Paul was recognized as one of the 100 Influential Minnesotans in Health Care by Physician Magazine. In 2013, he was named the sixth most powerful person in Minnesota by Minnesota Monthly Magazine.

Thissen has been active in community activities. He served on the boards of the Minnesota Justice Foundation and numerous other local nonprofits.

Minnesota House of Representatives

Early Service
Thissen was elected to the Minnesota House of Representatives in 2002, in his first run for public office.

During his first two terms, Thissen was a key player in passing major changes to Minnesota's eminent domain laws to protect the rights of individual property owners, the merger of the insolvent Minneapolis Teachers Retirement Fund into the statewide teacher's pension fund, a nation-leading law to curb abusive tax-preparer practices, and an overhaul of state campaign law.

In 2006, Thissen served as Finance Co-Chair of the House DFL Caucus and raised more money than the Republican opposition. In the election that November, the DFL added 19 seats to its majority. Politics in Minnesota named Thissen one of the big "winners" of the 2006 election in its November 9, 2006 edition.

From 2007 to 2010, Thissen served as chair of the Health and Human Services Committee. Before becoming minority leader in 2011, he also served on the Health Finance Committee, the Biosciences Committee, the Telecommunications Division, the Finance Committee, the Rules Committee and the Legislative Commission on Pensions and Retirement. Thissen also served as speaker pro tempore.

Thissen was chief author of HF 1, the Children's Health Security Act. The proposal, which would provide health coverage to all children in Minnesota families who make under $60,000 per year, passed the Minnesota House in 2007.

Thissen served on the Health Care Access Commission and also served on Governor Tim Pawlenty's Health Transformation Taskforce. In 2008, he played a key role in passing health-care reform legislation that the Minneapolis Star Tribune named the prize of the 2008 session.

In the 2010 election, the DFL lost its majority in the Minnesota House. Thissen was elected by his peers to be the Minority Leader for the DFL House Caucus. He was named 2012 Legislator of the Year by Politics in Minnesota. Thissen led the Democrats back to control of the Minnesota House in the 2012 election.

Speaker of the House
After leading his caucus to victory in the 2012 election, the Minnesota House of Representatives elected Thissen Speaker for the 2013-14 legislative sessions. He became speaker on January 8, 2013.

The 2013 session was among the most productive in a generation, passing the first significant investment in early childhood education in Minnesota history; all-day, every-day kindergarten for every five-year-old in the state; a two-year tuition freeze for public college and university students; and the legalization of same-sex marriage. The legislature also passed the Minnesota Dream Act, providing in-state tuition for the children of undocumented immigrants, and expanded health coverage for hundreds of thousands of Minnesotans, creating a Minnesota-based health insurance exchange called MNSure. Minnesota's 2013 legislative session received national attention. The Washington Post named Thissen an "Emerging Star Outside the Beltway."

The 2014 session continued this progressive work. The legislature increased the minimum wage from among the nation's lowest to $9.50 and indexed the wage to inflation in the future. It also enacted $550 million in middle-class tax cuts, including additional significant property-tax relief, and passed limited medical marijuana legislation. And the legislature enacted the Women's Economic Security Act, a package of policy ideas Thissen had made his top priority for the session, which includes pay equity requirements for state contractors, workplace protections for caregivers and new mothers, and incentives for women entrepreneurs. Upon the session's conclusion, the Star Tribune commented, "For the most part, Minnesota is once again the state that works."

In January 2015, Thissen was elected Minority Leader by his DFL colleagues; he served in that position through the end of 2016.

Role in new Viking Stadium financing
In 2012, Thissen, then House minority leader, was instrumental in securing public financing for U.S. Bank Stadium, along with Governor Mark Dayton and then Minneapolis Mayor R.T. Rybak.

Minnesota gubernatorial campaigns

In November 2008, Thissen launched an exploratory campaign for the 2010 Minnesota gubernatorial race. On July 24, 2009, he officially announced his candidacy, noting that he would focus on the issues of health care, renewable energy and education. Thissen's campaign surprised many since he started as an unknown in a field of high-profile candidates yet built broad support across the state.

At the April 2010 DFL State Convention, Thissen won more delegates than any of his rivals in the large Congressional districts outside the Twin Cities of Minneapolis and St. Paul. He outlasted several candidates, but ultimately withdrew from the race after the fifth round of balloting, which led to a two-person race between then House Speaker Margaret Anderson Kelliher and Minneapolis Mayor R.T. Rybak.

On June 15, 2017, Thissen announced that he would run for governor again in the 2018 election. He withdrew from the race in February 2018.

Minnesota Supreme Court

On April 17, 2018, Governor Mark Dayton appointed Thissen to be an associate justice of the Minnesota Supreme Court. As a result, Thissen resigned from the legislature, effective April 20. Although 17 former legislators have served on the Minnesota Supreme Court, Thissen is the first to move directly from the legislature to the court. He is also the first former House Speaker to serve on the court. He was sworn in on May 14, 2018.

In 2020, Thissen was elected to a full term on the Supreme Court. He was endorsed by the Minneapolis Star Tribune and Forum Communications. He defeated Michelle MacDonald with just over 59% of the vote. Thissen won in all eight Congressional Districts in Minnesota and in 86 of 87 counties.

Elections

See also
 Minnesota gubernatorial election, 2010

References

External links

 Paul Thissen on Twitter
 Paul Thissen on Facebook
 Rep. Thissen Speech on Children's Health
 2010 gubernatorial campaign videos

|-

|-

|-

|-

Living people
1966 births
21st-century American judges
21st-century American politicians
American people of Danish descent
American people of Norwegian descent
Harvard University alumni
Justices of the Minnesota Supreme Court
People from Bloomington, Minnesota
Speakers of the Minnesota House of Representatives
Democratic Party members of the Minnesota House of Representatives
University of Chicago Law School alumni